Cordora: Lulutang Ka sa Sarili Mong Dugo is a 1992 Filipino action film about Gaudencio "Boy" M. Cordora, a chief inspector for the Philippine National Police. Directed by Francis "Jun" Posadas, it stars Eddie Garcia as the titular police inspector, alongside Daniel Fernando, Roi Vinzon, Roy Alvarez, Tessie Tomas, Fred Montilla, Dick Israel, Roberto Talabis, Zandro Zamora, and Banjo Romero.

Based on real events, the film was produced by First Films and was released on June 24, 1992, as part of the revived Manila Film Festival, winning the award for Best Picture, Best Actor, and Best Actress. Despite this, critic Justino Dormiendo criticized the film as a routine Filipino action film, and considered its "superhuman" depiction of Cordora to be the "depth of idiocy".

Cast

Eddie Garcia as Gaudencio "Boy" M. Cordora
Daniel Fernando
Roi Vinzon
Roy Alvarez
Tessie Tomas
Fred Montilla
Dick Israel
Roberto Talabis
Zandro Zamora
Banjo Romero
Jobelle Salvador
Vanessa Escano
Jenny Roa
Jess Lapid Jr. as Ben Tumbling
Gabriel Romulo
Rey Ravelo
Jonathan Gabriel
Raul "Boy Fernandez
Edward Salvador
William Magallanes Jr.
Rey Lapid
Leo Lazaro
Robert Miller
Jim Rosales
Tony Tacorda
Ben Dato
Danny Rojo
Marlo Escudero
Ernie Zarate
Ross Olgado
Nanding Fernandez
Vic Felife
Flora Gasser

Production

Pre-production
Preparations for Cordora lasted six months, with screenwriter-actor Tony Tacorda researching into Gaudencio Cordora's life.

Casting
Tessie Tomas, a comedian and actress mostly known for her imitations of Imelda Marcos, was cast in Cordora against type in a dramatic role as the wife of Gaudencio Cordora.

Filming
Principal photography took place over four months.

Critical response
Justino Dormiendo, writing for the Manila Standard, gave Cordora a negative review. He criticized the film's screenplay and direction, noting that the storytelling offered nothing new for the action genre, "content as it is with the usual intramurals of bloody confrontations, domestic feuds and the law enforcer's death-defying feats". Dormiendo was also critical of the film's "superhuman" depiction of Cordora, stating that him surviving numerous gunshots to his body is "the depth of idiocy." For the actors, he was disappointed with Eddie Garcia's exaggerated acting and Tessie Tomas' "hardly believable" character, and expressed that with the exception of Roy Alvarez as the "gutsy" leader of the New People's Army, the supporting actors were the typical victims and villains of action films.

References

External links

1992 films
1992 action films
Action films based on actual events
Filipino-language films
Films about police officers
Films set in Metro Manila
Philippine action films
Philippine biographical films
First Films films
Films directed by Francis Posadas